The Nnewi monarchy is a traditional inheritance of the throne based on patrilineality and sonship heredity. In Nnewi the traditional monarch is called the Igwe. The Igwe is born and not made or elected, and the institution of inheritance is the traditional right and primogeniture privilege. The position is neither transferable nor negotiable.

There have been 20 monarchs of Nnewi Kingdom (see List of Monarchy of the Nnewi). A Kingdom of Nnewi was formed around 1498 with the original settlement of Mmaku, the grandfather of Nnewi. The present reigning monarch is Igwe Orizu III is the 20th monarch in the Nnofo Royal lineage.

Igwe of Nnewi 

An "igwe" is a king, basically, and this is a title used consistently throughout northern Igbo-speaking areas. The term is associated with the sky deity, pointing to the king's elevated status – also to his consecration/installation as something like a divinity on earth. The Igwe of Nnewi would be the king of the spirit of Nnewi; chi meaning spirit or life force. The primary cult of most northern Igbo towns is that of the Ana/Ani (the land goddess), and chi usually is considered to be a more human-scaled spirit. However, the term chi is part of one of the major deities of the north, Chineke – the ambigendered creative force that is often associated with Ani. (Ani is sometimes said to be married to Igwe – earth to sky. This divine marriage is also referenced in many northern Igbo royal systems.)

English-speaking Igbo frequently use the titles of English royalty ("His Royal Highness") to refer to their indigenous rulers .... The main thing to remember is that kings partake of the divinities in this region and are important ritual practitioners; any Igwe is also the head of the royal cult – and his ancestors are invoked on behalf of the entire town. Most northern Igbo kingships are not hereditary in a simple sense, however.  There are kingly clans whose male members are eligible for kingship, and then there are kingmaker clans, whose elders have the task of "discovering" the new king during the interregnum. This is a process that is part-divination – and Ofos might well be involved – and part hard-nosed indigenous politics (30 Nov 2002).

But in Nnewi the kingship is a traditional and hereditary monarchy with a tetrarchy system whereby the four-quarters of Nnewi has an Obi who has autonomous jurisdiction to his quarter alone. But the Igwe is the Isi obi (head of the Obis) and hence the Igwe, which literally translates as the heavenly one or highness as he is the holder of the Ofo, the religious and political symbol. He is born and not made or elected, and the institution of inheritance is the traditional right and privilege.  He is also an Obi. Obi is the title held by ruling chiefs; it is the equivalent of a duke in the nobility.

Current Igwe of Nnewi 

Until now, the ruling house of Otolo which is as well that of the entire Nnewi is in Nnofo family in Otolo, Nnewi. In the other three-quarters of Nnewi, his influence is also felt although there are Obi in Uruagu, Umudim and Nnewichi quarters. The present incumbent Kenneth Onyeneke Orizu succeeded his father as Igwe Orizu III in 1963 after the death of his father Igwe Josiah Orizu II. He was educated at Hope Waddell College, Calabar. Before his enthronement, Kenneth worked as a Representative of the then Eastern Nigerian Outlook Group of newspapers, in the defunct Eastern Region of Nigeria. He was also a very successful businessman in Kano.

Each of the four arms has a traditional head called the Obi. Since Otolo is the first arm, the Obi of Otolo is also the Igwe of Nnewi: he leads rather than rules. Within the four arms, there are also villages, and within the villages, there are umunna or big families. Each level has an obi as its traditional head. The position of every obi is hereditary by primogeniture. In the event that an obi dies without a son, his oldest brother takes over. This tradition has existed since time immemorial. Nobody schemes to become an obi or the Igwe. If the first son is guilty of bloodshed or some other taboos, he will not inherit his father's throne. Because the throne is not open for contest, it has helped to ensure peace in the town for generations.

Role of the monarch 

The role of the monarch is limited to the four quarters of Nnewi, and have no part in the formal governance of Anambra State. The monarch and the members of the royal family undertake a variety of official, unofficial and other representational duties within Nnewi, Nigeria and abroad.

The four Obi of Nnewi 

There are Obis in the four clans that make up Nnewi. The highest and the most senior obi is the Obi of Otolo, who is also the Igwe of Nnewi. Chief Nnamdi Obi, Obi Bennett Okafor and Obi George Onyekaba are the current obis of Uruagu, Umudim, and Nnewichi, respectively. These three obis with Igwe Orizu, III as chairman constitute the Igwe-in-Council and they deliberate on the spiritual, traditional, and communal matters, in Nnewi.

Links to the Ofo shrine 

"Ofo" refers to a particular type of staff (as well as the wood from which it's made) that is carried by elder men – notably patrilineage priests and some masqueraders. Christopher Ejizu, in his invaluable but very arcane book, Ofo: Igbo Ritual Symbol (Enugu: Fourth Dimension 1986), tells us that there is an ofo masquerade group in the Nnewi area called the Ofo-Anunu-Ebe and later associates that ofo group with the practice of "sending" the spirit of ofo out against miscreants. ... I believe that ofo can generally be inherited through the paternal line, and that it is also associated with the work of some healer-diviners (ndi dibia) in divination (afa). This is complicated ritual [practice], and you see a lot of variation -as with most Igbo ritual – from town to town (30 Nov 2002).

The ritual of consecration of the higher grades of Ofo, professional and institutional Ofo, is a much more elaborate exercise in most parts of Igboland. The items normally used bespeak the status of Ofo. For instance, for the Ofo-Ataka, the symbol of the highest grade of Ozo title in Nnewi, the aspirant would make a gift of a cow, a goat, and very many other things to the kindred that acts as the protector of that particular Ofo (4 Dec 2002).

Commenting on Ejizu's observation the FMC professor said that it tells us that there are institutionalized and "professional" types of Ofo in the Nnewi area – not only personal ones. This speaks to the idea of Ofo cult .... These less personal Ofo can be very dangerous objects indeed; if used for the good of the town, they can find and punish criminals. If used to meet the ends of the cult membership, they can cause harm to people who have crossed them – but who not necessarily are criminals in any simple sense. Ozo-titled men are important elders and fierce politicians; evidently in Nnewi, they can be invested with one of these institutional Ofo, besides having their own lineage-tied staffs (4 Dec 2002).

Ofo are symbol objects. The Ofo is the sacred symbol of truth, justice, law and authority. It plays a role in sacrificial rituals, prayer, oath taking, pronouncing judgement, deliberating policy within the family or community and involving blessings or curses. Brass Ofo often serve as symbols of family or community authority and become revered family heirlooms.

Bronze Ofo serve as symbols of power and authority for office holders and titled men, or a sacred family icon. Ofo represents the collective power of the ancestors and the truths given by Chuku (The High God). The Ofo, symbolizes the link between the living holder of family or ruling authority and their ancestors (Nancy Neaher).

Ofo also symbolize the link they make between Chukwu the High God and Humanity, and between the living, the dead, and those yet to be born (Njaka). Ofo plays a role in prayer, ritual sacrifice, contact of spirit patrons, magical uses, naming ceremonies, determining calendars of events, affirming moral uprightness, sealing covenants, legitimizing states or office, decision making, settling disputes, taking oaths of administration, and promulgating and enforcing laws (Christopher Ejizu) (Aug. 1999).

List of Igbo Nnewi Monarchs
Since 1477, the List of Igbo Nnewi Monarch and the dates of their reigns has been chronicled.

References

Igbo monarchs
Nnewi monarchs
Nigerian traditional rulers
People from Nnewi